All for One was a Canadian reality television series hosted by Debbie Travis. The series aired on CBC, and followed Travis as she travelled around the country helping community heroes with their home renovations. Renovations had to be completed in 5 days, and everyone from locals in the community to Travis' own team take part.

Similar in format to Extreme Makeover: Home Edition, it aired on CBC from September 26 to November 21, 2010.

References

External links
 

CBC Television original programming
Home renovation television series
Makeover reality television series
2010 Canadian television series debuts
2010 Canadian television series endings
2010s Canadian reality television series